Cylindrepomus cyaneus is a species of beetle in the family Cerambycidae. It was described by Maurice Pic in 1924. It is found in Vietnam.

References

Dorcaschematini
Beetles described in 1924